María Kodama Schweizer (born March 10, 1937) is the widow of Argentine author Jorge Luis Borges and the sole owner of his estate after his death in 1986. Borges had bequeathed to Kodama his rights as author in a will written in 1979, when she was his literary secretary, and bequeathed to her his whole estate in 1985. They were married in 1986, shortly before Borges' death.

Biography
Kodama is the daughter of an Argentine mother of Swiss-German, English and Spanish descent and a Japanese father. She met Borges when she was a student, at one of his lectures in Buenos Aires on Icelandic literature.

After the death in 1975 of Borges's ninety-nine-year-old mother, with whom he had lived all his life, Kodama became Borges’s literary secretary and had the opportunity—at the invitation of Borges's caretaker, "Fanny"—to assist him as a blind old man in his frequent travels abroad during his later years, when he received many invitations by institutions from around the world. Kodama helped Borges write, as he had lost his sight. She collaborated with him in Breve antología anglosajona (1978) and Atlas (1984, an account of their travels together) and in the translation of the Younger Edda by Snorri Sturluson.Kodama married Borges through representatives in a civil proceeding in Paraguay on April 26, 1986. This was a common practice for Argentines wishing to circumvent the restrictions on divorce in their country at the time, and Borges was already married once but for many years estranged from his first wife. At the time of the wedding, Borges was terminally ill and died of cancer in Geneva, Switzerland, on June 14, 1986.

She is president of the Fundación Internacional Jorge Luis Borges, which she founded in Buenos Aires in 1988.

After Borges's death, Kodama renegotiated the English translation rights of his works. In particular, she terminated a longstanding agreement between Borges and the translator Norman Thomas di Giovanni under which royalties for a number of translations on which they collaborated were divided equally between author and translator. New translations by Andrew Hurley were commissioned and published to replace the di Giovanni translations, which were allowed to go out of print.

Kodama's assertive administration of the Borges estate also resulted in a bitter dispute with the French publisher Gallimard regarding the republication of the complete works of Borges in French, with Pierre Assouline in Le Nouvel Observateur (August 2006) calling her "an obstacle to the dissemination of the works of Borges." Kodama took legal action against Assouline, considering the remark unjustified and defamatory, asking for a symbolic compensation of one euro.

References

External links

 Fundación Internacional Jorge Luis Borges
 Official Facebook

Argentine women writers
Argentine translators
1937 births
Argentine people of Japanese descent
Living people
People from Buenos Aires
Argentine agnostics
Argentine people of Swiss-German descent
Argentine people of English descent
Argentine people of Spanish descent
Jorge Luis Borges
20th-century translators